Denis Zabolotin (born 18 June 1998) is a Russian handball player for HC Meshkov Brest and the Russian national team.

He represented Russia at the 2020 European Men's Handball Championship.

References

External links

1998 births
Living people
Russian male handball players
Sportspeople from Krasnodar